Theatre Brook (シアター・ブルック Shiatā Burukku) is a Japanese funk rock band that made its debut in 1986. The band's current line-up are: Taiji Sato (vocals & electric guitar), Takashi Nakajo (bass), Takashi Numazawa (drums), and Emerson Kitamura (keyboard). They have been signed with Epic Records since 1995. They are known for performing the first opening theme of the 2010 anime Durarara!!, Uragiri no Yuuyake.

Band members
Current members
 – lead vocals, lead guitar
 He formed the music group "Young Miracle" with Kō Machida in 2002.
 – bass
 He is also active in the band "couch".
 – keyboards
 ex- Mute Beat, ex-Jagatara
 He works as a session musician with various musicians like Ego-Wrappin', Kazuyoshi Saito, and Leyona.
 – drums
 He works as a session musician with various musicians like Yuko Ando, Chage, Miki Furukawa, Ken Hirai, Yōsui Inoue, Hiromi Iwasaki, Toshiki Kadomatsu, Ryuichi Kawamura, Inoran, Tourbillon, Kiyoharu, Leyona, Noriyuki Makihara, Kazufumi Miyazawa (AFROSICK), Mika Nakashima, Maki Ohguro, Tamio Okuda, Taeko Onuki, Ai Otsuka, Ami Ozaki, Quruli, Ringo Sheena, Sing Like Talking, Shikao Suga, Ayano Tsuji, Masayoshi Yamazaki, Akiko Yano, Minako Yoshida, YUI.
 Because he studied in PIT (Percussion Institute of Technology) in Los Angeles in his youth, he has worked with many American musicians such as Chaka Khan, Bobby Womack, Al McKay, Verdine White, The Emotions, Hiram Bullock, Will Lee, Randy Brecker, Robben Ford, Jeff Berlin.

Former members
 – sampling, Moog synthesizer
 – turntabling
 – drums

Discography

Singles
  (22 November 1995)
  (22 May 1996)
  (1 May 1997)
  (1 August 1997)
 Soul Diver (20 June 1998)
  (21 October 1998)
  (21 January 1999)
  (21 May 1999)
  (2 February 2000)
  (23 March 2000)
  (21 May 2003)
  (25 May 2005)
  (24 February 2010)

Albums
  (December 1991) EP
 Sensemilla (September 1993)
 Calm Down (21 June 1995) Mini Album
 Talisman (24 June 1996)
 Tropopause (22 October 1997)
 Typhoon Shelter (12 December 1997) Soundtrack
 Viracocha (20 February 1999)
 Special (23 February 2000) Best of album
 I Am The Space, You Are The Sun (19 April 2000)
 Theatre Brook (4 June 2003)
 03.04.28 LOFT / 03.06.22 LIQUID ROOM (19 November 2003) Live album
 The Complete Of Theatre Brook (10 March 2004) Best of album
 Reincarnation (22 June 2005)
 Intention (September 2010)
 "Live long and prosper" Tour (27 July 2011) Live album
 Saikin no Kakumei [最近の革命] (12 December 2012)
 LOVE CHANGES THE WORLD (19 July 2015)
 Album Mishuuroku Gakkyoku [アルバム未収録楽曲] (21 August 2019)

Other works
 "AFRICA feat.Taiji Sato from Theatre Brook" by A Hundred Birds
 "All The Children Are Insain" (August 1988) Vinyl record
 A2. "Shadows of Flowers"
 Parade -Respective Tracks of Buck-Tick- (21 December 2005, "Rokugatsu no Okinawa") Tribute album
 Truck 8. 
  (24 October 2007) Tribute album
 Disc2, Truck 7.

External links

Official website

Japanese rock music groups
Funk rock musical groups
King Records (Japan) artists
Musical groups from Tokyo